Sepa is an Oceanic language of northeast New Guinea.

References

Languages of Madang Province
Schouten languages
Vulnerable languages